Elisabeth Amelie Antoinette Auguste "Betsy" Muus (30 June 1891 – 21 October 1986) was a Belgian sculptor. Her work was part of the sculpture event in the art competition at the 1932 Summer Olympics.

References

1891 births
1986 deaths
20th-century Belgian sculptors
Belgian women sculptors
Olympic competitors in art competitions
People from Arnhem